For a Lasting Peace, for a People's Democracy! was the press organ of the Information Bureau of the Communist and Workers' Parties (Cominform). The first issue was published on November 1, 1947, from the Yugoslav capital Belgrade. The last issue to be published from Belgrade came out in June 1948. From July 1948 the newspaper was subsequently published from Bucharest, Romania, after a decision of the Second Cominform Conference to move the editorial office out of Belgrade.

The newspaper sought to promote exchanges between communist parties. The publication was banned by the French government in early 1951, after which a new French-language edition titled Paix et démocratie ('Peace and Democracy') began to be published in France.

The publication of For a Lasting Peace, for a People's Democracy! ended in April 1956.

Different Languages 
Published weekly, it was issued in English, and the under different titles, in the following languages:

French: 
Russian: 
Bulgarian: 
German: 
Spanish: 
Czech: 
Hungarian: 
Polish: 

Initially there had also been a Serbo-Croat language edition:

References

External links

 Five articles from 1950-1953

Mass media in Belgrade
Newspapers published in Bucharest
Communist newspapers
1947 establishments in Yugoslavia
1956 disestablishments in Romania
Eastern Bloc mass media
Publications established in 1947
Publications disestablished in 1957
Defunct newspapers published in Romania